Tolkāppiyam chapter 1-2 refers to the first two chapter of part 1 of the Tolkāppiyam, the earliest available work in the Tamil language.

 Chapter 1 deals with the arrangement of characters.

 Chapter 2 explains the depending letters occurring only in words. It also covers the structural pattern of the words with their initial and ending phonemes. Assimilation of these three with other phonemes is also dealt here.

The name of the chapter is combined with two words. (mozi+marabou). The word ‘mozi’ in Tamil denotes a language. Language is a meaningful word or words conveyed by human beings. Here mozi is used to denote a word and combination of words (phrases) by metonym. Marabou, a word in Tamil denotes the inherited custom of Tamil language. Here the title of the chapter denotes inherited custom of phrases in Tamil.

Depending (Secondary) letters
 Shorted [m] is created between the combination of two words kēḷ (hear) and ya (a particle of optative mood or a mood to wish somebody)  kēṇmiyā
 Shorted ‘i’ is created by yā:  nākiyātu
 Shorted ‘u’ occurs six times
 Shorted ‘u’ occurs in words-between
 Softer ‘h’ occurs before six hard-consonants.
 Softer ‘h’ occurs also in words-between
 Softer ‘h’ occurs in words of sound and hardness of materials.

Longing vowels and consonants
 Longing vowels follow by long vowels
 Longing vowel for ‘ai’ is ‘i’ and for ‘au’ is ‘u’.
 7 long vowels become word
 No short vowel becomes a word.
 Words are divided into three according to their structures. Word in single-letter, Word with two-letter and Word with more-letters
 Consonant is pronounced with ‘a’

Assimilation and dissimilation of consonants
 All consonants relate with their own consonant.
 [y], [r], [z] consonants relates with the following [k], [s], [th] [p] consonants.
 [r] and [z] consonants never agree to stand their own consonant and also each other.
 Syllable with more than 2 units of phonetic sound is to be considered as more-letter word among the three structural forms of words spoken above (in 12) புகர், புகழ்
 Consonants [n] and [m] relate in one word at the end of a poem. போன்ம்
 There [m] loss its unit of phonetic sound from half into quarter.
 Letters reserve their own phonetic sound in separation and in combination in a word.

Like-letter (not dupe) போலி
 Diphthong [ai] may separate as [a][i] ஐயர், அஇயர்
 Diphthong [au] may separate as [a][u] ஔவை, அஉவை
 Diphthong [ai] may also separate as [a][y] ஐயர், அய்யர்
 Diphthong may loss its unit of phonetic sound from 2 to 1
 [i] and [y] are like-letters நாய், நாஇ

Initial letter in Tamil words
 All 12 vowels become initial letter of words.
 No consonant becomes initial letter of a word
 Five consonants become initial letter of words merging with 12 vowels
 Consonant [s] becomes initial letter only merging with 9 of the 12 vowels. There is no word with the initial ‘sa’, ‘sai’, ‘sau’.
 Consonant [y] even with merging with [u], [U], [o], [O] vowels, never becomes as an initial letter of a word.
 Consonant [nj]becomes only with merging [A], [e], [o] vowels, as an initial letter of words. ஞாயிறு, ஞெகிழி, ஞொள்கிற்று.
 [y] consonant becomes as an initial letter of words merging with only one vowel [A] யாறு, யான்
 While denoting a letter all letter become as initial letter.
 Shorted [u] becomes as initial letter in one word ‘nunthai’. நுந்தை
 This one word ‘nunthai’ is pronounced both shorted and non-shorted.

Ending vowels in Tamil words
 All vowels except [au] end in words.
 However [au] ends merging with [k] and [v] i.e., in the words ‘kau’ and ‘vau’ (meaning catch by mouth and catch respectively).
 Vowel [e] does not end with the merging consonants.
 Vowel [o] also does not end with merging consonants, except ‘n”o’, (a verb denoting the meaning ‘to harm’ others or ‘to be in distresses oneself.)
 Vowel [E] and [O] do not end with the merging consonant [nj].
 Vowel [u] and ‘U’ do not end with the merging consonant n"
 Consonant [s] merging with the vowel [u] ends in two nouns. (‘pasu’ meaning cow and ‘musu’ meaning ape).
 Consonant [p] merging with the vowel [u] ends in one verb both in active and passive voices. (‘t’abu’ = die oneself, make another die)
 Either vowel or consonant which are defined above as non-ending phonetics end in word while denting itself (ex. He deletes ‘ke’)

Ending consonants in Tamil words
 Ending consonants are 11. They are [nj], [n'], [n"], [m], [n], [y], [r], [l], [v], [z], [l’].
 Consonant [n"] ends in two words. (porun’ = combat or expose feelings in dance, verin’ = spine)
 Consonant [nj] ends in one word ('urign' = skin of a body
 Consonant [v] ends in four words 'av' = they, 'iv' = these, 'uv' = those, 'thev' = enmity)

Interchange of consonants in Tamil
 There are nine words ending in n which do not change to m whether vowel or consonant comes after.
(ex. ar’an anr’u = it is not a benevolent way of life – n stands before vowel, ar’am sey = do benevolent deeds – m stands before consonant)
 The 9 words according to commentators are:
1. egin = tamarind, beaver
2. Segin = shoulder,
3. Vizan = wastage,
4. Payin = lac,
5. Azan = fiery,
6. Puzan = dead body,
7. Kuyin = curving art,
8. Kadaan = saliva,
9. Vayaan = a kind of desire of a pregnant woman to eat dry clay.

Footnotes

References 

 Tolkappiyam (Tamil original with the commentary of 'Ilambuuranar, தொல்காப்பியம் இளம்பூரணர் உரை)
 Tholkappiyam (in English) S. Ilakkuvanar, Kural Neri Publishing House, Madurai – 6, year 1963
 Tolkappiyam in English, by Dr. V. Murugan, Project Director Dr. G. John Samuel, Institute of Asian Studies, Chennai, India, 2000.

Tamil-language literature